The 2010 Indonesian Community Shield was the second edition of the Indonesian Community Shield. It was a match played by the 2009–10 Indonesia Super League winners Arema Indonesia and 2010 Piala Indonesia winners Sriwijaya FC. It took place on 25 September 2010 at the Kanjuruhan Stadium in Malang, Indonesia. Sriwijaya won the match 3–1.

Match details

References

Indonesian Community Shield
Arema F.C.
Sriwijaya F.C. matches
2010–11 in Indonesian football